Preteen Weaponry is the ninth full-length album by Brooklyn-based Alternative rock/Indie rock/Krautrock/Psychedelic rock band Oneida.

Track listing
 "Preteen Weaponry, Pt. I"  – 14:30
 "Preteen Weaponry, Pt. II"  – 11:26
 "Preteen Weaponry, Pt. III"  – 13:53

References

2008 albums